Mücke Motorsport is an auto racing team based in Germany, which is also known as ADAC Berlin-Brandenburg.

History

Single-seaters
Mücke Motorsport was formed by Peter Mücke in 1998 to run his son Stefan Mücke in the German Formula BMW ADAC series, in which they were champions. Stefan and the team moved to German Formula Three in 1999, where the driver finished runner-up in 2001. Also in 2001, Markus Winkelhock joined the team. After Stefan left Formula 3 for the DTM in 2002, Winkelhock was joined by Sven Heidfeld and Marcel Lasée. The team moved to the new Formula Three Euroseries in 2003, where Christian Klien finished runner-up.

Mücke competed in Formula BMW ADAC from 1998 to 2007. Sebastian Vettel won the title for the team in 2004.

For 2010, Peter Mücke's partnership with Ralf Schumacher sees the RSC Mücke Motorsport team enter the newly formed GP3 Series. Dutchman Renger van der Zande spearheads the driver line-up alongside compatriot Nigel Melker and German Tobias Hegewald.

Since 2015, the team competes in the ADAC Formula 4 and Italian F4 Championship.

DTM

The team began running Mercedes in the Deutsche Tourenwagen Masters in 2005 with Stefan Mücke and Alexandros Margaritis as drivers. Mücke remained with the team in 2006 and was joined by Daniel la Rosa and Susie Stoddart.  In 2007 Stefan Mücke left the team and was replaced by Mathias Lauda. La Rosa, Stoddart and Lauda left the team for 2008, and were replaced by Ralf Schumacher and Maro Engel. Lauda returned to partner Engel in 2009.

Current series results

Deutsche Tourenwagen Masters

DTM Trophy

Former Series Results

Italian F4 Championship

*He only drove for Mücke Motorsport in 3 of the 20 races.

ADAC Formula 4

Formula 4 UAE Championship

GP3 Series

 D.C. = Drivers' Championship position, T.C. = Teams' Championship position.

European Formula 3

 D.C. = Drivers' Championship position, T.C. = Teams' Championship position.

ADAC Formel Masters

The team competed as ADAC Berlin-Brandenburg in 2010,2013-2014

Timeline

Notes

References

External links 
 
 Team profile on the DTM website
 

German auto racing teams
1998 establishments in Germany
Auto racing teams established in 1998
Deutsche Tourenwagen Masters teams
GP3 Series teams
Formula BMW teams
Formula 3 Euro Series teams
FIA Formula 3 European Championship teams
British Formula Three teams
German Formula 3 teams
ADAC GT Masters teams
Mercedes-Benz in motorsport